The La Tinh River is a river of Vietnam. It flows for 54 kilometres through Bình Định Province.

References

Rivers of Bình Định province
Rivers of Vietnam